Cognitive pretesting, or cognitive interviewing, is a field research method where data is collected on how the subject answers interview questions. It is the evaluation of a test or questionnaire before it's administered.  It allows survey researchers to collect feedback regarding survey responses and is used in evaluating whether the question is measuring the construct the researcher intends. The data collected is then used to adjust problematic questions in the questionnaire before fielding the survey to the full sample of people.

Cognitive interviewing generally collects the following information from participants: evaluations on how the subject constructed their answers; explanations on what the subject interprets the questions to mean; reporting of any difficulties the subject had in answering the questions; and anything else that reveals the circumstances to the subject's answers.

Cognitive pretesting is considered essential in testing the validity of an interview, test, or questionnaire.

Purpose 
The purpose of these pretests is to:

 make sure that the test or interview is understandable 
 address any problems the participants may have had with the test
 measure participants attention and curiosity to the questions
 measure the scale of answers (Ex: is the whole scale being used, or do answers vary too much)
 assess question order and other context effects
 problems with the interviewers 
 address any technical problems with the test (Ex: glitches with any technology, or grammatical errors)
 and how long it takes to take the test or interview.

Types
In general, there are many methods practiced when conducting a cognitive pretest. Including: conventional pretesting, cognitive interviewing, behavior coding, respondent debriefing, group discussion, expert review, eye tracking, and web probing.

Conventional pretesting-This is similar to a rehearsal that tries to imitate and model after what the real test or interview will be like. A simulation of real test or interview that takes place prior to the real one. Whatever method used in the actual interview or test should be used in this method of pretesting.

Cognitive pretesting (cognitive interviewing)- very similar to conventional pretesting. However, the participants are actively being asked about the questions as they take the test. It's conducted during the interview or test.

They can also be presented in multiple different ways including: written surveys, oral surveys, electronic surveys

Techniques 
There are certain techniques that the interviewer implements in cognitive pretesting to extract the information needed to ensure a good interview or questionnaire.

The think-aloud technique- This occurs when the interviewer asks the interviewee to vocalize their thoughts and how they came to their answer. This can be concurrent (during) or retrospective (after) the interview.

Probing technique- This occurs when the interviewer asks the interviewee one or more follow-up questions. They 'probe' about the questions asked, terminology used, or even the responses.

Paraphrasing- This occurs when the interviewer asks the interviewee to use their own words to repeat the question. This tests to make sure the questions are understandable.

Confidence rating- This occurs when the interviewer asks the interviewee about their confidence in how correctly they answered the question.

Sorting- This occurs when the interviewer asks the interviewee or tries to understand how the interviewee categorizes certain situations or even terms.

Participants and Recruitment  
Sample size is a very important topic in pretests. Small samples of 5-15 participants are common. However, it is best if the sample size is at least 30 people. More is always better.

Having a small sample can lead to problems within the test not being discovered.

There are two different methods of telling participants about the questionnaire: participating pretests and undeclared pretest.

Participating pretests make sure that the participants know that the test they are completing is just a practice run. This is used mostly in probing and thinking-out-loud technique, or cognitive pretesting and interviewing

undeclared pretests are tests in which the participants don't know that his is a practice run. This is most like conventional pretesting. If more than one pretest occurs on a study it is recommended that participating pretest is first, then undeclared second.

Use by Survey Researchers
Cognitive interviewing is regularly practiced by U.S. Federal Agencies, including the Census Bureau, National Center for Health Statistics and the Bureau of Labor Statistics.

References

Survey methodology